Jackson Arnold is an American football quarterback for the Oklahoma Sooners.

Early life and high school career
Arnold was born in Atlanta, Georgia and grew up in Denton, Texas, where he attended John H. Guyer High School. As a freshman and sophomore he was mainly the backup to future Texas A&M quarterback  Eli Stowers. As a junior, Arnold passed for 3,921 yards 34 touchdowns and also rushed for 659 yards and 12 touchdowns. He was initially rated a four-star recruit and committed to play college football at Oklahoma from 25 scholarship offers.

Arnold participated in the finals of the 2022 Elite 11 quarterback competition and was named the tournament's MVP. Entering his senior year, he was re-rated a five-star recruit.  At the conclusion of his senior year at Guyer, Arnold was named the 2022 winner of the Landry Award, given annually to the top high school football player in the Dallas-Fort Worth Metroplex. Arnold was named the Gatorade National Player of the Year following his senior season.

College career
Arnold joined the Oklahoma Sooners as an early enrollee in January 2023.

References

External links
Oklahoma Sooners bio

Living people
Players of American football from Texas
American football quarterbacks
Year of birth missing (living people)